Aldar kose, (native name ) is a Kazakh folk fairy tale and name of main character. He is the collective image of the sly but very kind man. In fairy tales he is a swindler, cheating the greedy rich, evil Khans and helping the poor and weak people. The Historical Dictionary of Kazakhstan refers to him as a "creative liar".

In theatre and film
A play Aldar-Kose, a folk-comedy by Shakhmet Khusainov, was published in the early 1940s. In 1964 a Soviet film simply entitled Aldar-Kose was produced by Sh. Aimanov. In Turkmenistan a children's film,  Prikluchenia Aldar-Kose (The Adventures of Aldar Kose), was released in 1970.
"Aldar-Kose / Shaven Impostor" (1964) 
. Aldar-Kose (cartoon, 1976)
. As Aldar-Kose outwitted tiger (animation, 1976) 
. "Aldar-Kose" (2011) 
 .Animation Series "Aldar Kösenіñ köñіldі oqigalary" - 83 series. Production Studio Azia Animation (2009-2011) Authors: Igor Kraus and Arthur Kraus.

References

External links
  — Алдар-көсе мультфилмі

Kazakhstani culture
Kazakh legends
Kazakh folklore
Tricksters
Humor and wit characters